Benqué-Molère is a commune in the department of Hautes-Pyrénées, southwestern France. The municipality was established on 1 January 2017 by merger of the former communes of Benqué (the seat) and Molère.

See also 
Communes of the Hautes-Pyrénées department

References 

Communes of Hautes-Pyrénées